On 25 May 2022, three explosions hit a group of minivans in the Afghan city of Mazar-i-Sharif, Balkh Province. 9 people were killed and 15 others wounded.

Taliban authorities said that the terrorists responsible had placed IEDs inside the vehicles. The bombings are believed to have been directed at Afghan Shia passengers.

The Islamic State – Khorasan Province claimed responsibility via the Amaq News Agency.

See also 
 2022 in Afghanistan
 2022 Mazar-i-Sharif mosque bombing
 28 April 2022 Mazar-i-Sharif bombings
 May 2022 Kabul mosque bombing, which happened the same day
 Terrorist incidents in Afghanistan in 2022

References 

2022 murders in Afghanistan
21st century in Balkh Province
21st-century mass murder in Afghanistan
Improvised explosive device bombings in 2022
Improvised explosive device bombings in Afghanistan
ISIL terrorist incidents in Afghanistan
Islamic terrorist incidents in 2022
Mass murder in 2022
May 2022 crimes in Asia
May 2022 events in Afghanistan
2022 minivan bombings
Terrorist incidents in Afghanistan in 2022
Violence against Shia Muslims in Afghanistan
Car and truck bombings in Afghanistan